Titanio tarraconensis is a species of moth in the family Crambidae. It is found in France, Spain and North Africa, including Morocco.

References

Moths described in 1982
Odontiini
Moths of Europe